The 1891 Kentucky Derby was the 17th running of the Kentucky Derby. The race took place on May 13, 1891. The winning time of 2:52.25 was the slowest winning time in Derby history.

With each rider under orders to stay off the lead until the stretch, all four horses ran abreast the whole way waiting for someone to make a move. This resulted in the field to canter their way around the track going a mile in 2:01, a mile and a quarter in 2: and finishing the mile and half race in 2:52.

Full results

Winning breeder: A. C. Franklin (TN)

Payout
 The winner received a purse of $4,550.
 Second place received $300.
 Third place received $150.

References

1891
Kentucky Derby
Derby
May 1891 sports events